This article contains information about the literary events and publications of 1654.

Events
July – Lady Dorothy Osborne plays the leading role in a country-house staging of Sir William Berkeley's tragicomedy The Lost Lady. While the London theatres remain closed, amateur theatricals continue at private houses in England. Like performances of courtly masques before 1642, many of these performances feature women, foreshadowing the acceptance of professional women performers in the early Restoration era.

New books

Prose
Roger Boyle, 1st Earl of Orrery – Parlhenissa, a novel
Martino Martini – De Bello Tartarico Historia
John Milton – Defensio Secunda
Richard Sherlock – The Quaker's Wilde Questions objected against the Ministers of the Gospel.

Drama
Anonymous – Alphonsus Emperor of Germany published (wrongly attributed to George Chapman)
Alexander Brome – The Cunning Lovers
Richard Flecknoe – Love's Dominion
Henry Glapthorne (?) – Revenge for Honour published (wrongly attributed to George Chapman)
James Howell – The Nuptials of Peleus and Thetis (published)
Thomas Jordan – Cupid His Coronation
Thomas May – Two Tragedies, viz. Cleopatra and Agrippina (published)
Robert Mead – The Combat of Love and Friendship (published)
John Webster (and Thomas Heywood?) – Appius and Virginia (published)
 Álvaro Cubillo de Aragón
El invisible príncipe del Baúl
Las muñecas de Marcela
El señor de Noches Buenas
Agustín Moreto
De fuera vendrá quien de casa te echará
El desdén, con el desdén (first published)
Cyrano de Bergerac – Le Pédant joué ("The Pedant Tricked")
Philippe Quinault – L'Amant indiscret
Joost van den Vondel – Lucifer

Poetry
Thomas Washbourne – Divine Poems

Births
January 10 – Joshua Barnes, English scholar and fiction writer (died 1712)
January 22 – Richard Blackmore, English poet and physician (died 1729)
March – Anne Lefèvre (Madame Dacier), French scholar and translator (died 1720)
March 16 – Andreas Acoluthus, German Orientalist (died 1704)
June 24 – Thomas Fuller, English writer and physician (died 1734)
Unknown dates
John Bellers, English writer and Quaker (died 1725)
Gerrit van Spaan, Dutch writer (died 1711)

Deaths
February 18 – Jean-Louis Guez de Balzac, French essayist (born 1697)
February 19 – Edmund Chilmead, English writer and translator (born 1610)
April 5 – Jacobus Trigland, Dutch theologian (born 1583)
October – John Bastwick, English physician and controversialist (born 1593)
November 30
William Habington, English poet (born 1605)
John Selden, English polymath (born 1584)
December – Robert Carr, 1st Earl of Ancram, Scottish nobleman and writer (born c. 1578)
Unknown dates
Walter Blith, English writer on husbandry (born 1605)
Edward Misselden, English mercantilist writer (born 1608)
Alexander Ross, Scottish controversialist (born c. 1590)

References

 
Years of the 17th century in literature